Cheng Shiqing (April 1918 – April 29, 2008) was a People's Liberation Army major general and People's Republic of China politician. He was born in Xin County, Henan Province. He was Chinese Communist Party Committee Secretary and governor of Jiangxi Province.

See also 

 Ruijin Massacre

1918 births
2008 deaths
People's Republic of China politicians from Henan
Chinese Communist Party politicians from Henan
People's Liberation Army generals from Henan
Governors of Jiangxi
Political office-holders in Jiangxi